Sebastian Fini Carstensen (born 26 March 1995) is a Danish multi-discipline cyclist, who currently competes in cross-country cycling for UCI Elite MTB team CST PostNL Bafang, and in road cycling for UCI Continental team . He competed at the 2018 UCI Mountain Bike World Championships, winning a bronze medal in the team relay.

Major results

Mountain Bike

2014
 1st  Cross-country, National Championships
2015
 1st  Cross-country, National Championships
 2nd  Team relay, UCI World Championships
2016
 1st  Cross-country, National Championships
2017
 1st  Cross-country, National Championships
 2nd  Team relay, UCI World Championships
2018
 1st  Cross-country, National Championships
 3rd  Team relay, UCI World Championships
2019
 1st  Cross-country, National Championships
2020
 1st  Marathon, National Championships
2021
 2nd  Cross-country, UEC European Championships
2022
 1st  Cross-country, National Championships
 2nd  Cross-country, UEC European Championships
 UCI XCC World Cup
3rd Mont-Sainte-Anne

Cyclo-cross
2017–2018
 1st  National Championships
2018–2019
 1st  National Championships
2019–2020
 1st  National Championships
2020–2021
 1st  National Championships
2022–2023
 1st  National Championships

References

External links

1995 births
Living people
Danish male cyclists
Danish mountain bikers
Cyclo-cross cyclists
Cyclists at the 2020 Summer Olympics
Olympic cyclists of  Denmark